Rodney Edward "Rod" Murphy (born 16 October 1946 in Winnipeg, Manitoba) was a New Democratic Party member of the House of Commons of Canada. He was a teacher by profession.

He represented the Manitoba riding of Churchill where he was first elected in the 1979 federal election. He was re-elected in the 1980, 1984 and 1988 federal elections, therefore serving in the 31st, 32nd, 33rd and 34th Canadian Parliaments.

Murphy left federal politics after his defeat in the 1993 federal election to Elijah Harper of the Liberal party.

Electoral history

References
 

1946 births
Living people
Members of the House of Commons of Canada from Manitoba
New Democratic Party MPs
Politicians from Winnipeg